Farid Guliyev (born 6 January 1986 in Baku) is an Azerbaijani professional footballer (striker) who plays for Yozgatspor.

Career

Club
In July 2013 Guliyev signed a one-year contract with Kahramanmaraşspor. 
In September 2014, after being released by Araz-Naxçıvan, Guliyev signed for Sumgayit.

Career statistics

International

Statistics accurate as of match played 3 September 2014

International goals

Honors

Club
Neftchi Baku
Azerbaijan Premier League (2): 2010–11, 2011–12
Araz-Naxçıvan
Azerbaijan First Division (1): 2013–14

Individual
Azerbaijan Premier League Top Scorer (1): 2009–10

References

External links

1986 births
Living people
Footballers from Baku
Azerbaijani footballers
Azerbaijani expatriate footballers
Expatriate footballers in Turkey
Azerbaijani expatriate sportspeople in Turkey
Qarabağ FK players
FC Baku players
FK Standard Sumgayit players
Simurq PIK players
Turan-Tovuz IK players
Kapaz PFK players
Sumgayit FK players
Azerbaijan Premier League players
TFF First League players
Araz-Naxçıvan PFK players
Association football forwards
Neftçi PFK players
Azerbaijan international footballers